Parapsyra is a genus of Asian bush crickets of the tribe Holochlorini: in the subfamily Phaneropterinae.

Species 
The Orthoptera Species File  lists the following species recorded from Indo-China, China and Malesia:
Parapsyra brevicauda Liu, 2011
Parapsyra fuscomarginalis Liu & Kang, 2006
Parapsyra laticauda Karny, 1926
Parapsyra midcarina Liu & Kang, 2006
Parapsyra muricetincta Karny, 1926
Parapsyra nigrocornis Liu & Kang, 2006
Parapsyra nigrovittata Xia & Liu, 1992
Parapsyra notabilis Carl, 1914 - type species (locality Phúc Sơn, central Vietnam)

References

External links
 
 See Orthoptera Species File for pictures of preserved type sp.

Tettigoniidae genera
Phaneropterinae
Orthoptera of Asia